Claude Ernest Désiré Koum Maka (born 16 May 1985) is a Cameroonian born Kyrgyzstani professional football player, whose last known club was Turc Lausanne in the Swiss 3. Liga.

Career
Maka Kum was abandoned in Moscow aged 17 by a roque agent that disappeared once they'd arrived in Russia. After a while in Moscow, Maka Kum went on trial, and signed for Illichivets Mariupol. Six months later, Maka Kum left Illichivets Mariupol and returned to Moscow. After a trial with Dynamo Makhachkala, Maka Kum was approached by, and joined, KAMAZ in 2005 before quickly following the Head Coach to Dordoi Bishkek.

In February 2010, Maka Kum signed for Dacia Chișinău of the Moldovan National Division, before joining CF Găgăuzia on loan on 31 August 2010. In July 2013, Maka Kum went on trial with Dnepr Mogilev of the Belarusian Premier League.

After moving to Switzerland, Maka Kum went on trial with Lausanne-Sport before signing for Siviriez thanks to Andrei Rudakov. Maka Kum then went on to stay in Switzerland, playing for Echallens, Azzurri 90 Lausanne and FC Renens, despite interest from the Russian Professional Football League.

Career statistics

Club

International

Statistics accurate as of match played 5 September 2014

Honours
Dordoi Bishkek
Kyrgyzstan League (4): 2007, 2008, 2009, 2012
Kyrgyzstan Cup (2): 2008, 2012

Notes

External links
  
 
 
 

1985 births
Living people
Cameroonian emigrants to Kyrgyzstan
Kyrgyzstani footballers
Kyrgyzstan international footballers
FC Dordoi Bishkek players
FC Dacia Chișinău players
FK Dainava Alytus players
Kyrgyzstani expatriate footballers
Expatriate footballers in Moldova
Kyrgyzstani expatriate sportspeople in Moldova
Expatriate footballers in Lithuania
Expatriate footballers in Oman
Kyrgyzstani expatriate sportspeople in Oman
Expatriate footballers in Switzerland
Association football wingers
Association football forwards